Almont is an unincorporated community and U.S. Post Office in Gunnison County, Colorado, United States.  The ZIP Code of the Almont Post Office is 81210.

History
The town of Almont was platted in 1881 on the Fisher Ranch.  Samual Fisher allegedly named the town for Almont of Kentucky, the horse that sired his favorite stallion.  The Almont Post Office opened on March 6, 1882. In the late 19th century, miners in the area brought their ore to Almont, where it was transported by train to Gunnison.  In its present form, the town consists of two four-season resorts and a small year-round population.

Geography
The Taylor River and East River meet in Almont where they become the Gunnison River as it flows southwest.

See also

Outline of Colorado
Index of Colorado-related articles
State of Colorado
Colorado cities and towns
Colorado counties
Gunnison County, Colorado

References

External links

Gunnison-Crested Butte Tourism Office (official tourism website)
Almont Real Estate & Community Information

Unincorporated communities in Gunnison County, Colorado
Unincorporated communities in Colorado